IRCX (Internet Relay Chat eXtensions) is an extension to the Internet Relay Chat protocol, developed by Microsoft.

IRCX defines ways to use Simple Authentication and Security Layer authentication to authenticate securely to the server, channel properties/metadata, multilingual support that can be queried using the enhanced "LISTX" command (to find a channel in your language), an additional user level (so there are three levels: owners, hosts, and voices), specific IRC operator levels, and full support for UTF-8 (in nicknames, channel names, and so on). IRCX is fully backwards compatible with IRC; the new features are downgraded to something a standard IRC client can see (and UTF-8 nicknames are converted to hexadecimal).

IRCX was originally supported on Microsoft Exchange Server 5.5 (in place of the old Microsoft Chat protocol, which is a binary protocol) and a module was available for Microsoft Exchange 2000.

Microsoft started to put IRCX through a standardisation process with the Internet Engineering Task Force by publishing 4 Internet Drafts of their protocol.

See also
 Internet Relay Chat

References

External links
 IRCX Draft The latest revision of the IRCX draft
 TesX Server Free, Open Source, Platform independent IRCX server

Internet Relay Chat
MSN
protocols related to Internet Relay Chat